Afghan literature or literature of Afghanistan refers to the literature produced in the Islamic Emirate of Afghanistan. Influenced by Central and South Asian literature, it is predominantly written in two native and official languages of Afghanistan, Dari and Pashto. Some regional languages such as Uzbek, Turkmen, Balochi, and Pashayi also appears in Afghan literature. While Afghanistan is a multilingual country, these languages are generally used as oral compositions and written texts by the Afghan writers and in Afghan curriculum. Its literature is highly influenced by Persian and Arabic literature in addition to Central and South Asia.

The history of the broader Afghan literature spans between ancient and modern Afghanistan. The earliest works of literature were orally transmitted. It's writing system is historically associated with Arabic script. The oldest extant records of the literature are believed derivative of the Nabataean variation of the Aramaic alphabet, dating to the 5th and 6th centuries. However, it primarily originated in the early Islamic centuries.

Archaeological researches conducted since 1922 has shown fine art of the pre-Islamic scripts. The country's literature was originally written and transmitted in Arabic alphabet, making it to possess a rich linguistic legacy of pre-Islamic scripts, which existed before being replaced by the Arabic alphabet, including Sharada, Kharosthi, Greek, and Brāhmī following by the Islamic conquest of Afghanistan. Bactrian language is also associated with pre-Islamic scripts.

Contemporary literature
Afghanistan's contemporary literature has its deep roots in rich heritage of both oral composition and traditionally written texts. The natives of Afghanistan either living within the country or outside use major languages, Pashto and Dari. Both languages are used by the 32 million people in Afghanistan, making the two officially recognized languages cover a major part of Afghanistan's literature. Afghanistan's literature is historically recorded by poets and writers. In 1886, a French author James Darmesteter wrote about the historical context of Afghanistan's literature and the role of poets.

It's argued that Pashtun poems, including Sher Zaman Taizi's book titled The Field (1988) had played a significant role in literature. In the modern era, Afghan poets and short story writers are actively engaged in writing poetry, comprising a detained account of literature.

Medieval period literature 
Afghanistan's literature is historically associated with the civilizations of Iran, China, and India. The country witnessed development of artistic work during the Ghaznavids dynasty and the Ghurid dynasty between 10th and 12th century. However, the Timurid dynasty shaped culture and artistic activities in the Islamic era.

Since Afghanistan has a rich literary identity, folklore and traditional custom songs reveal centuries-old as well as modern Afghan literature. Afghan literature has its roots in Dari, Pashto, Arabic, and Turkic languages as they were extensively used in the medieval period. Afghan rulers such as the Samanid Empire, the Ghaznavids, the Timurids, and the Mughal Empire, were highly influenced by Persian literature. They encouraged and supported the writers such as Rumi, Jami, Rudaki, Ferdowsi, and Khwaja Abdullah Ansari for writing in Persian language.

Epic poem, Shahnameh by Firdawsi is regarded as one of the important works, while Rumi is regarded as one of the greatest poets in Afghan literature who shaped Persian literature. However, his writings were later translated into English.

Colonial literature
Because of the large immigration to other countries in the 16th to 18th centuries, the articulation of ideals, and the early establishment of literary institutions and learning environments outside the country have often been regarded as the center of early Afghan literature. During those centuries, many literary figures originated in the undivided region, but following the partition between Mughal empire and Safavid dynasty, several poets, including Khushal Khattak moved to literary centres. Khattak lived in the Hindu Kush mountain range. By the late 19th century, Pakhtuns sung poetry with music for making it identical to ghazals, a classical Urdu genre.

Literary, Afghan, Turkic, and Pashto literature share identical traditions, and are collectively recognised as Persian literature, however, Afghanistan's literature is a distinct one which has its own traditions and customs of writing system, and oral-formulaic composition in particular.

Modern literature 

In the 20th century, Kabul, the capital of the country became the center for literary figures and publishing. Mahmud Tarzi was the editor of Seraj al Akhbar, Kabul's first literary newspaper circulated from 1911 to 1919. He is often known for his contribution for the development of modern literary environment. Over the past decades, Afghanistan produced several literary figures including Khalilullah Khalili and Sayed Buhaniddin Majruh. Khalili is referred to as "Renaissance man" for his contribution to modern literature.

Mahmud Tarzi was actively involved in promoting Pashto as a national language and providing information and news through Seraj al Akhbar newspaper. During that period, Seraj ul Akhbar played significant role in modernising Afghan society through its articles. A French novelist Jules Verne, also translated the work into foreign language. He became the first writer to publish the first books printed in independent Afghanistan.

The rise of poetry 

Afghan poetry and culture has a long history dating back to the rise of Sufism. Poetry was written in various shared languages such as Persian, Dari, Pashto, and very few in Urdu. Poetry in foreign languages such as English and Turkic also has a strong influence on Afghan poetry. The poetry reflects diverse spiritual traditions within the country. In particular, many Afghan poets have been inspired by mystical and Sufism experiences. Afghan poetry is the oldest form of literature and has a rich written and oral tradition. In Afghanistan, poetic expression exists for centuries. The great poet Rumi was an Afghan poet who wrote in Dari language throughout his life. Other poets also wrote in Dari, however several other poets were deeply influenced by Persian, Pashto and Arabic Languages. Modern women usually write the traditional Afghan poetry form, consisting of two lines of rhyme, called landay.

Authors and poets

Proverbs

Afghan proverbs are generally simple, concrete, and traditional saying. They usually express a perceived truth based on common sense or experience. Some proverbs are categorised by the events occurred in real life or based on imagination facts that temporarily create objects, peoples and ideas without any immediate input of the senses.

Afghan proverbs primarily exist in two officially recognised languages. Unrecognised or anonymous proverbs exist in more than two languages because people borrow them from foreign or regional languages similar to Afghan languages.

References

Further reading 
 

Afghan culture
Afghan literature